STAM-binding protein is a protein that in humans is encoded by the STAMBP gene.

Function 

Cytokine-mediated signal transduction in the JAK-STAT cascade requires the involvement of adaptor molecules. One such signal-transducing adaptor molecule contains an SH3 domain that is required for induction of MYC and cell growth. The protein encoded by this gene binds to the SH3 domain of the signal-transducing adaptor molecule, and plays a critical role in cytokine-mediated signaling for MYC induction and cell cycle progression. Multiple alternatively spliced transcript variants encoding the same protein isoform have been found for this gene.

Mutations in this gene have been associated to cases of microcephaly (doi:10.1038/ng.2602)

Interactions 

STAMBP has been shown to interact with RNF11, Signal transducing adaptor molecule and GRAP2.

References

Further reading